The 1936 William & Mary Norfolk Division Braves football team represented the Norfolk Division of the College of William and Mary, now referred to as Old Dominion University, during the 1936 college football season. They finished with a 4–4 record.

Schedule

References

William and Mary Norfolk Division
Old Dominion Monarchs football seasons
William and Mary Norfolk Division Braves football